The following is a list of the MTV Europe Music Award winners and nominees for Web Award.

2000's

Best Inter Act

See also 
 MTV Video Music Award for Best Artist Website

MTV Europe Music Awards
Awards established in 2001